Uriondo is a town in the Bolivian Tarija Department.

Uriondo is the administrative center of José María Avilés Province and is located at an elevation of 1,709 m on the confluence of Río Rochero and Río Camacho, 25 km south of Tarija, the department capital.

Uriondo has a population of circa 2,500 inhabitants.

External links
Map of province

Populated places in Tarija Department